The inscriptions of Shapur II and Shapur III at Taq-e Bostan, are located about 5 kilometers away from the northeast of Kermanshah and date to the Sasanian era. The inscription shows Shapur II on the right and Shapur III on the left. Two inscriptions in Middle Persian are etched on both sides. The inscriptions contain their names and their lineages. The inscription of Shapur II contains 9 lines and the inscription of Shapur III contains 13 lines.

Sources 
 
 

Sasanian inscriptions
Shapur II
Rock reliefs in Iran